The Sturt Cricket Club (formerly the Unley Cricket Club) is a semi-professional cricket club in Adelaide, South Australia. It competes in the South Australian Grade Cricket League, which is administered by the South Australian Cricket Association (SACA).

The club entered the SACA competition in season 1897/98.

The club has produced a number of prominent players including current players Mohammed Arhaan Tai, Cullen Bailey, Jason Borgas, Cameron Borgas, and Tom Moffat.

The Blues play their senior home games at the Price Memorial Oval at Angas Road, Hawthorn, South Australia.   C and D grade matches are played at the Unley Oval.

External links 
 SCC official site
 SACA

South Australian Grade Cricket clubs
Cricket clubs established in 1897
1897 establishments in Australia